Fusil may refer to:

Fusil, a light flintlock musket used by a fusilier
Fusil (heraldry), a heraldic ordinary similar to a lozenge
Gerald Fusil, creator of the Raid Gauloises adventure race
Duopyramid, a kind of polytope